Paul Raci (born April 7, 1948) is an American character actor. A veteran of stage, film and television, he has appeared in a variety of projects, including small roles in Baskets and Parks and Recreation. In 2021, he was nominated for the Academy Award for Best Supporting Actor for his performance in Sound of Metal (2019). In the same year, he was selected by BJ Sam the Nigerian   international singer and producer to represent the United States in the first universal Christmas music project with other global music icons including Bollywood playback singer Jaspinder Narula, Swiss actress  Christina Zurbrügg, and Ghanaian singer  Diana Hopeson.

Life and career
Raci was born in Chicago, Illinois, the son of Laurel and Mitchell Raci. His family is of Polish descent, originally surnamed Racibożyński. He was raised as the hearing son of deaf parents, and is fluent in American Sign Language. Raci was a Hospital Corpsman in the United States Navy, attaining the rank of Petty Officer Second Class (HM2). He served aboard the aircraft carrier, the USS Coral Sea (CVA-43) from 1969 to 1973, serving two tours in Vietnam.

Raci received critical acclaim for his performance as Joe, the deaf mentor to the main character in Sound of Metal, released in 2020. For this role, he received the National Society of Film Critics Award for Best Supporting Actor and other accolades, including an Independent Spirit Award for Best Supporting Male, and nominations for both the BAFTA Award for Best Supporting Actor and the Academy Award for Best Supporting Actor. According to director Darius Marder, several high-profile actors were approached for the role, but for the sake of authenticity, Raci was selected because of his upbringing.

Filmography

Film

Television

Awards and nominations

References

External links

1948 births
Living people
20th-century American male actors
21st-century American male actors
American male film actors
American people of Polish descent
Independent Spirit Award for Best Supporting Male winners
Military personnel from Chicago
United States Navy corpsmen
United States Navy personnel of the Vietnam War
United States Navy non-commissioned officers